Davíð Þór Viðarsson (born 24 April 1984) is a former Icelandic footballer who played as a midfielder for FH and the Iceland national team.

He was the club captain of Úrvalsdeild club FH Hafnarfjörður. He had previously played in the Norwegian Premier League with Lillestrøm SK and has represented his country on 9 occasions.

He signed for Swedish Superettan club Östers IF on a three-year contract in December 2009 .

On 14 August 2012, Viðarsson joined Danish 1st Division side Vejle Boldklub Kolding on a two-year contract.

Personal life
Davíð is the brother of fellow Icelandic midfielders Arnar and Bjarni. Their father, Viðar Halldórsson was also a professional footballer.

He is a candidate for the Independence Party in the 2017 election.

References

External links

1984 births
Living people
David Vidarsson
David Vidarsson
Expatriate footballers in Norway
Expatriate footballers in Belgium
Expatriate footballers in Sweden
Expatriate men's footballers in Denmark
David Vidarsson
Eliteserien players
Belgian Pro League players
Superettan players
Lillestrøm SK players
David Vidarsson
David Vidarsson
K.S.C. Lokeren Oost-Vlaanderen players
Östers IF players
Vejle Boldklub Kolding players
David Vidarsson
David Vidarsson
David Vidarsson
Association football midfielders